Craig Douglas (born Terence Perkins, 13 August 1941) is an English pop singer, who was popular in the late 1950s and early 1960s. His sole UK chart-topper, "Only Sixteen" (1959), sold more copies in the UK than Sam Cooke's original version.

Career
Born a twin, in Newport, Isle of Wight, the former Terence Perkins was employed as a milkman before becoming a professional singer and was known to many as the 'Singing Milkman'. His manager was Bunny Lewis, who gave him the name Craig Douglas. Lewis saw the name outside a house in Scotland. Douglas said there were a number of Terrys around at the time and not many Craigs and that was one of the reasons his name was changed.

Voted 'Best New Singer' in 1959 in the British music magazine, NME, Douglas went on to record eight cover versions of former American hit songs, in his total of nine Top 40 UK singles. Amongst that tally, Douglas had a Number One single in 1959 with "Only Sixteen", which easily outsold Sam Cooke's original version in the UK. It was recorded at EMI's Abbey Road studios, with whistling by Mike Sammes, and released through Top Rank records. Douglas had four consecutive Number 9 placings on the UK Singles Chart.

In 1961 Douglas entered the A Song For Europe contest with his song "The Girl Next Door" but did not do well. Douglas also starred in the 1962 film It's Trad, Dad!

He topped the bill on the Beatles' first major stage show, although their emergence ultimately spelt the end of Douglas's chart career. His final chart entry came in February 1963, when "Town Crier" flopped at Number 36.

He continues to perform, with bookings at night clubs and on cruise ships. Until 2010, Douglas toured venues across the UK, including the Medina Theatre on the Isle of Wight. He appeared at the Amersham Rock 'n' Roll Club on 11 December 2010, an event in his benefit. John Leyton, Mike Berry and the Flames all took part, while Jet Harris and other celebrities attended. Douglas sang three songs from his wheelchair at the close of the concert. He suffers from a rare condition that affects his legs. Sky News filmed the event.

On 18 April 2011, a rare Douglas recording saw a limited 7" vinyl reissue of "Don't Mind If I Cry", produced by Tony Hatch, on the UK-based Spoke Records label. This had previously been the B-side to Douglas' 1969 release, "Raindrops Keep Fallin' On My Head", a cover of the B.J. Thomas song. Douglas' 2011 album, The Craig Douglas Project, included his versions of "Auberge" and "Creep".

Discography

Albums

Studio albums 

 Craig Douglas (1960) – UK #17
 Bandwagon Ball (1961)
 Our Favourite Melodies (1962) – SWE #10
 Looking Back: Greatest Hits (2005) – tracks re-recorded
 The Golden Anniversary Album (2008) – tracks re-recorded
 The Craig Douglas Project (2011)

Compilation albums 

 Oh Lonesome Me (1981)
 Only 16 (1984)
 The Best of the EMI Years (1993)
 The Very Best of Craig Douglas (2004)
 Only Sixteen (2019)

Singles 

Notes

Releases on the Top Rank label
 BUY049: Craig Douglas – album – UK Albums Chart – Number 17
 35/103: Bandwagon Ball – album
 JAR110: "Come Softly to Me" / "Golden Girl" – single
 JAR133: "A Teenager in Love" / "The 39 Steps" – single
 JAR159: "Only Sixteen" / "My First Love Affair" – single
 JAR204: "Wish It Were Me" / "The Riddle of Love" – single
 JAR268: "Pretty Blue Eyes" / "Sandy" – single
 JAR340: "The Heart of a Teenage Girl" / "New Boy" – single
 JAR406: "Oh What a Day" / "Why Why Why" – single
 JAR515: "Where's the Girl (I Never Met)" / "My Hour of Love" – single
 JAR543: "The Girl Next Door" / "Hey Mister Conscience" – single
 JAR555: "A Hundred Pounds of Clay" / "Hello Spring" – single (A-side uncensored)
 JAR556: "A Hundred Pounds of Clay" / "Hello Spring" – single
 JAR569: "Time" / "After All" – single
 JAR589: "No Greater Love" / "We'll Have a Lot to Tell the Children" – single
 JAR603: "A Change of Heart" / "Another You" – single
 JAR610: "When My Little Girl is Smiling" / "Ring-A-Ding" – single
 JKR8033: "Craig Sings For Roxy" – EP

See also
List of NME covers
List of artists who reached number one on the UK Singles Chart
List of number-one singles from the 1950s (UK)
United Kingdom in the Eurovision Song Contest 1961
UK No.1 Hits of 1959

References

External links
 Douglas's entry at 45-rpm.org
 [ Allmusic page]
 Spokerecords.co.uk

1941 births
Living people
English male singers
English pop singers
English twins
People from Newport, Isle of Wight
Traditional pop music singers